JCO is a Japanese nuclear fuel cycle company established in October 1979 as a wholly owned subsidiary of Sumitomo Metal Mining Co., Ltd. as Japan Nuclear Fuel Conversion Co. .  As of 2000, stock capitalization was US$1 billion.

Timeline 
 1979 JCO was founded
 1980 Sumitomo Metal Mining Co., Ltd. conversion activities were handed over to JCO
 1983 The second factory building at Tokaimura was completed
 1998 The name was changed to just JCO
 1999 Tokaimura nuclear accident
 2003 Uranium conversion activities stopped

References 
 

Nuclear fuel companies
Nuclear technology companies of Japan
Energy companies established in 1979
Defunct energy companies of Japan
Energy companies disestablished in 2003
Japanese companies established in 1979
Japanese companies disestablished in 2003